Damon Beesley (born 1971) is an English writer and television producer, best known for his work on British comedy The Inbetweeners and New Zealand comedy Flight of the Conchords. He often works alongside his writing partner Iain Morris.

In 2017, a six-part comedy series, White Gold, aired on BBC Two in the UK which Beesley had directed, created and written.

Filmography
The Pilot Show (2004) (producer)
Flight of the Conchords (2007–2009) (writer)
The Inbetweeners (2008–2010) (producer; writer; creator)
The Inbetweeners Movie (2011) (writer)
The Inbetweeners 2 (2014) (director; writer)
Siblings (2014) (executive producer)
White Gold (2017-2019) (director; writer; creator)
 The First Team (2020)

Awards
2008 – Writers Guild of America Award Nomination, Comedy Series (Flight of the Conchords)
2008 – Writers Guild of America Award Nomination, New Series (Flight of the Conchords)
2008 – British Comedy Award Win, Best New TV Comedy (The Inbetweeners)

References

External links
 
 

English television producers
English television writers
Living people
1971 births